Kathia Baba -  Contemporary group named after the founder who follow the philosophy of Dvaitādvaita Vaishnava Vedanta of Nimbarka.

References

External links

Vaishnavism